On 3 August 1979, a Constitutional Convention election was held in Lorestan Province constituency with plurality-at-large voting format in order to decide two seats for the Assembly for the Final Review of the Constitution.

The result was a landslide victory for the Islamic Republican Party whose candidates received more than 90% of the votes. The candidate of the right-wing nationalist Nation Party of Iran was placed third.

Results 

 
 
|-
|colspan="14" style="background:#E9E9E9;"|
|-
 
 
 
 
 

|colspan=14|Source:

References

1979 elections in Iran
Lorestan Province